John Eldred  (1629-1717), of Earl's Colne, Essex, was an English Member of Parliament.

He was a Member (MP) of the Parliament of England for Harwich in 1689, in the Convention Parliament.

References

1629 births
1717 deaths
17th-century English people
People from Essex
People of the Stuart period
Members of the Parliament of England (pre-1707)